Rice Research Station, Moncombu, is a research Station under the Special Zone of Problem Areas of Kerala Agricultural University at Moncombu in Alappuzha district of Kerala, India.

In 2013, The Centre for Rice Germplasm of this Rice Research Station, has developed new rice varieties with reduced harvesting cycle and increased pest and disease resistance to fight climate change.

References

External links

Agricultural research stations in Kerala
Rice research institutes
Rice production in India
Education in Alappuzha district
Year of establishment missing